Lee Parsons Gagliardi (July 17, 1918 – October 30, 1998) was a United States district judge of the United States District Court for the Southern District of New York.

Education and career

Born in Larchmont, New York, Gagliardi received an Artium Baccalaureus degree from Williams College in 1941. He received a Bachelor of Laws from Columbia Law School in 1947. He was a United States Naval Reserve Lieutenant from 1942 to 1945. He was an assistant to the general attorney of the New York Central Railroad Company from 1948 to 1955. He was in private practice of law in New York City from 1955 to 1972. He was Chairman of the Board of Police Commissioners in Mamaroneck, New York from 1970 to 1972.

Federal judicial service

Gagliardi was nominated by President Richard Nixon on December 2, 1971, to the United States District Court for the Southern District of New York, to a new seat created by 84 Stat. 294. He was confirmed by the United States Senate on December 11, 1971, and received his commission on December 15, 1971. He assumed senior status on July 17, 1985. His service was terminated on October 30, 1998, due to his death in Manchester, Vermont.

References

Sources
 

1918 births
1998 deaths
Columbia Law School alumni
Judges of the United States District Court for the Southern District of New York
United States district court judges appointed by Richard Nixon
20th-century American judges
Williams College alumni
American people of Italian descent
Military personnel from New York (state)
People from Larchmont, New York
People from Manchester, Vermont
United States Navy officers
United States Navy personnel of World War II
United States Navy reservists